George Aitken may refer to:

 George Aitken (footballer, born 1925) (1925–2003), Scottish footballer (East Fife, Sunderland and Scotland)
 George Aitken (footballer, born 1928) (1928–2006), Scottish football player (Middlesbrough and Workington) and manager (Workington)
 George Aitken (politician) (1836–1909), merchant and politician in Prince Edward Island, Canada
 George Aitken (rugby union) (1898–1952), rugby union player who represented New Zealand then Scotland
 George Atherton Aitken CB, MVO (1860–1917), a British civil servant, author, scholar, and a literary biographer